Edward Cebula (also known as Ewald; 22 March 1917 – 1 February 2004) was a Polish football player and defender. He played in five matches for the Poland national team as well as one match representing Poland at the Olympic Games.

He started in Śląsk Świętochłowice and his debut in Polish National Team occurred on 4 June 1939 in Warsaw, versus Switzerland (1-1). Then, Cebula played in the last, unforgettable game of interwar Poland - (Warsaw, 27 August 1939, Poland - Hungary 4–2).

His career was put on hold in 1939 following the outbreak of World War II. After the war, Cebula returned to Polish Team, appearing in the 1952 Summer Olympics. The best time in his career was in Ruch Chorzów where he played from 1948. He won Polish championship as a player in 1951, the playing trainer in 1952, and as a trainer in 1953, he had also managed Ruch for a while during the season 1960 when they won championship. He is member of the small group of players who played in national team before and after World War II. He won several more trophies before retirement from football in 1964, winning a title with Górnik Zabrze the previous year.

Following this he joined forces with Feliks Karolak and became one of the top trainers in Poland.

See also 

 The last game: 27 August 1939. Poland - Hungary 4-2

References

People from Świętochłowice
1917 births
2004 deaths
Śląsk Świętochłowice players
Ruch Chorzów players
Polish footballers
1938 FIFA World Cup players
Olympic footballers of Poland
Footballers at the 1952 Summer Olympics
Poland international footballers
Polish football managers
Górnik Zabrze managers
Ruch Chorzów managers
Zagłębie Sosnowiec managers
People from the Province of Silesia
Sportspeople from Silesian Voivodeship
Association football defenders